Walter B. McGrail (October 19, 1888 – March 19, 1970) was an American film actor. He appeared in more than 150 films between 1916 and 1951. Besides feature films, he appeared in The Scarlet Runner, a 12-chapter serial.

McGrail was born in Brooklyn, New York, and died in San Francisco, California, at the age of 81.

Selected filmography

 Thou Art the Man (1916) – Bearer
 The Ordeal of Elizabeth (1916) – Elizabeth's Father
 Lights of New York (1916) – Hawk Chovinski
 The Scarlet Runner (1916) – Morley Chester
 The Dollar and the Law (1916) – George Gray
 Indiscretion (1917) – Jimmy Travers
 The Courage of Silence (1917) – Saunders
 Womanhood, the Glory of the Nation (1917) – Count Dario
 Within the Law (1917) – Dick Gilder
 Over There (1917) – Minor Role
 The Song of the Soul (1918) – Dr. Evans
 The Business of Life (1918) – 
 The Triumph of the Weak (1918) – Jim Roberts
 Find the Woman (1918) – Maurice Dumars
 To the Highest Bidder (1918) – David Whitcomb
 Everybody's Girl (1918) – Blinker
 Miss Ambition (1918) – Larry Boyle
 Brown of Harvard (1918) – Gerald Thorne
 The Adventure Shop (1919) – Josephus Potts, Jr
 The Girl, Glory (1919) – Ernest Sanford
 The Country Cousin (1919) – George Tewksbury Reynolds III
 The Black Secret (1919) – Ray McKay
 Greater Than Fame (1920) – Jack Martin
 Blind Youth (1920) – Maurie Monnier
 The Invisible Divorce (1920) – Jimmy Ryder
 Life's Twist (1920) – Steven De Koven
 Darling Mine (1920) – Roger Davis
 Beware of the Bride (1920) – Billy Emerson
 Habit (1921) – Charles Munson
 The Breaking Point (1921) – Richard Janeway
 Playthings of Destiny (1921) – Hubert Randolph
 Pilgrims of the Night (1921) – Gilbert Hannaway
 The Invisible Fear (1921) – Arthur Comstock
 Her Mad Bargain (1921) – David Leighton
 The Cradle (1922) – Courtney Webster
 The Top of New York (1922) – Emery Gray
 The Yosemite Trail (1922) – Ned Thorpe
 The Kentucky Derby (1922) – Ralph Gordon
 Nobody's Money (1923) – Frank Carey
 Suzanna (1923) – Ramón
 Is Divorce a Failure? (1923) – Kelcey Barton
 Where the North Begins (1923) – Gabrielle Dupree
 The Eleventh Hour (1923) – Dick Manley
 The Bad Man (1923) – Morgan Pell
 Lights Out (1923) – Sea Bass
 Flaming Youth (1923) – Jamieson James
 A Son of the Sahara (1924) – Captain Jean Duval
 Unguarded Women (1924) – Larry Trent
 Gerald Cranston's Lady (1924) – Gordon Ibbotsleigh
 Is Love Everything? (1924) – Boyd Carter
 The Dancers (1925) – The Argentine
 Adventure (1925) – Tudor
 Champion of Lost Causes (1925) – Zanten / Dick Sterling
 The Mad Marriage (1925)
 Her Husband's Secret (1925)
 The Teaser (1925) – Roderick Caswell
 The Scarlet West (1925) – Lt. Harper
 Havoc (1925) – Roddy Dunton
 A Son of His Father (1925) – Holdbrook
 When the Door Opened (1925) – Clive Grenfal
 Forbidden Waters (1926) – J. Austin Bell
 The Combat (1926) – Milton Symmons
 Marriage License? (1926) – Marcus Heriot
 Across the Pacific (1926) – Capt. Grover
 The City (1926) – Jim Hannock
 Prisoners of the Storm (1926) – Sergeant McClellan
 The Secret Studio (1927) – Mr. Kyler
 Old San Francisco (1927) – Vasquez's Grandson – in Prologue
 American Beauty (1927) – Claverhouse
 Man Crazy (1927) – Van Breamer
 Stop That Man! (1928) – 'Slippery Dick' Sylvaine
 Midnight Madness (1928) – Childers
 The Play Girl (1928) – David Courtney
 The Old Code (1928) – Pierre Belleu
 Confessions of a Wife (1928) – Henri Duval
 Blockade (1928) – Hayden
 Hey Rube! (1928) – Duke
 The Veiled Woman (1929) – Diplomatic Attaché
 River of Romance (1929) – Major Patterson
 The Lone Star Ranger (1930) – Phil Lawson
 Men Without Women (1930) – Joe Cobb
 Soldiers and Women (1930) – Capt. Arnold
 Women Everywhere (1930) – Lieutenant of Legionnaires
 Anybody's War (1930) – Captain Davis
 The Last of the Duanes (1930) – Bland
 The Pay-Off (1930) – Emory
 River's End (1930) – Sergeant Martin
 Part Time Wife (1930) – Johnny Spence
 Seas Beneath (1931) – Chief Joe Cobb
 Night Nurse (1931) – The Drunk
 Murder by the Clock (1931) – Herbert Endicott
 Under Eighteen (1931) – Gregg (uncredited)
 Night Beat (1931) – Martin Andrews
 Union Depot (1932) – Pickpocket (uncredited)
 The Last of the Mohicans (1932, Serial) – Dulac
 McKenna of the Mounted (1932) – Inspector Oliver P. Logan
 Exposed (1932) – Johnny Russo
 Vanity Street (1932) – Detective Hanson (uncredited)
 Robbers' Roost (1932) – Henchman Brad
 State Trooper (1933) – Burman
 Police Call (1933) – Dr. James A. Gordon
 Sing Sinner Sing (1933) – Louis
 David Harum (1934) – Townsman (uncredited)
 The World Moves On (1934) – The Duallist (1825)
 A Demon for Trouble (1934) – Dyer
 The Lemon Drop Kid (1934) – Racetrack Tout (uncredited)
 Men of the Night (1934) – Louie
 All the King's Horses (1935) – Baron Kurt Chizlinska (uncredited)
 Sunset Range (1935) – Grant
 The Glass Key (1935) – Fickle Madvig Supporter (uncredited)
 Hard Rock Harrigan (1935) – Worker (uncredited)
 Call of the Wild (1935) – Spectator (uncredited)
 Special Agent K-7 (1936) – Vincent 'Lanny' Landers
 The Plainsman (1936) – Gambler #1 (uncredited)
 The Accusing Finger (1936) – Guard (uncredited)
 Ten Laps to Go (1936) – Drake – DeSylva's Mechanic
 Reefer Madness (1936) – The Boss (uncredited)
 The Shadow Strikes (1937) – Winstead Comstock
 The Fighting Deputy (1937) – Townsman (uncredited)
 The Mysterious Pilot (1937) – Jordan (uncredited)
 West of Rainbow's End (1938) – George Reynolds aka Johnson
 Held for Ransom (1938) – Donnelly
 On the Great White Trail (1938) – Garou
 Code of the Fearless (1939) – Ranger Capt. Rawlins
 In Old Montana (1939) – Joe Allison
 Stagecoach (1939) – Capt. Sickel (uncredited)
 The Sun Never Sets (1939) – Henchman DaCosta (uncredited)
 Calling All Marines (1939) – Capt. Chester
 The Green Hornet (1940, Serial) – Dean
 The Grapes of Wrath (1940) – Gang Leader (uncredited)
 My Little Chickadee (1940) – Townsman (uncredited)
 Billy the Kid Outlawed (1940) – Judge Fitzgerald
 Marked Men (1940) – Doctor (uncredited)
 The Son of Monte Cristo (1940) – Minor Role (uncredited)
 Mysterious Doctor Satan (1940) – Stoner
 Back Street (1941) – Reporter (uncredited)
 Along the Rio Grande (1941) – Cattle Buyer (uncredited)
 Last of the Duanes (1941) – Texas Ranger (uncredited)
 Appointment for Love (1941) – Stoddard (uncredited)
 Holt of the Secret Service (1941, Serial) – Ship Captain (uncredited)
 Dick Tracy vs. Crime, Inc. (1941, Serial) – Junction Heavy 1 / Marine Captain (uncredited)
 Billy the Kid Trapped (1942) – Judge Jack McConnell
 Riders of the West (1942) – Miller, the Banker
 Bowery at Midnight (1942) – Coroner (uncredited)
 A Double Life (1947) – Steve (uncredited)
 A Life of Her Own (1950) – Party Guest (uncredited)
 Here Comes the Groom (1951) – Newsreel Director (uncredited)

References

External links

1888 births
1970 deaths
American male film actors
American male silent film actors
People from Brooklyn
Male actors from New York City
20th-century American male actors
Film serial actors
Male Western (genre) film actors